Christian Nsiah (born 25 December 1975) is a retired Ghanaian sprinter who specialized in the 200 metres.

He competed at the 1999 World Championships and the Olympic Games in 1996, 2000 and 2004, but without reaching the final round on any occasion.

His personal best times are 6.58 in the 60 metres, achieved in January 1999 in Colorado Springs; 10.19 in the 100 metres, achieved in July 2000 in Lapinlahti; and 20.48 seconds in the 200 metres, achieved in April 2002 in Knoxville.

Together with Leo Myles-Mills, Aziz Zakari, and Eric Nkansah, he won the gold medal for the 4*100 meter relay at the 2003 All-Africa Games in Abuja, Nigeria.  He is the current holder of the Ohio Valley Conference indoor 55 meters record (6.24 secs).  There was a time he was mistakenly credited with the world record in the 55 meters, after his hand time of 5.81 secs was mistakenly recorded as electronic time.

He attended Middle Tennessee State University in Murfreesboro, Tennessee, where he obtained his bachelor's degree in business administration (1999), Master's degree in financial economics (2001), and his Doctor of Philosophy in economics (2005). Other schools he attended includes Southern University at New Orleans, University of Ghana (Legon), Opoku Ware School (Kumasi, Ghana), and Martyrs of Uganda Preparatory School (Ghana).

External links
 

1975 births
Living people
Ghanaian male sprinters
Middle Tennessee State University alumni
Commonwealth Games competitors for Ghana
Athletes (track and field) at the 1994 Commonwealth Games
Athletes (track and field) at the 1996 Summer Olympics
Athletes (track and field) at the 2000 Summer Olympics
Athletes (track and field) at the 2004 Summer Olympics
Olympic athletes of Ghana
African Games gold medalists for Ghana
African Games medalists in athletics (track and field)
Athletes (track and field) at the 2003 All-Africa Games
Alumni of Opoku Ware School
20th-century Ghanaian people
21st-century Ghanaian people